François Paris (born 28 October 1961 in Valenciennes) is a French composer and professor.

He is known for being part of the young generation of composers using microtonal music in the continuation of the spirit of the pioneers of this music.

Life 

He studied in the conservatoire of Versailles then in the Conservatoire de Paris with Ivo Malec, Betsy Jolas (analysis) and Gérard Grisey(composition and orchestration). Meanwhile, he studied orchestral direction. François Paris has received the award of the Concours International de Composition de Besançon. In 1993 he was selected and commissioned a work by Ircam. and studied at the French Academy in Rome (1993 to 1995).
His music is frequently broadcast in France and internationally. He received many commands from diverse institutions ( Ircam, Itinéraire, Radio-France, Nuova Arca, «La filature» de Mulhouse, State commands, etc.).

Compositional Techniques

François uses different forms of equal temperament in his music. Where 12 tone equal temperament is based on semitones ascending by root 2, Paris uses other root values, such as 1.2, 1.6 and 2.4, in order to stretch and shrink the temperament of the composition.

Selected works

Vocal music

 Les Champs de l'ombre blanche, 1991 		
 Les Confessions silencieuses, 1995–1996 	
 Murs, pour quatre voix et orchestre de chambre

Concerto music
 L'Empreinte du cygne, double concerto pour violoncelle, piano et orchestre 	1997-1998

Orchestral music
 La Chair de l'aube, pour orchestre 	1992

Ensemble music
 Sur la Nuque de la mer étoilée, pour sept instrumentistes 	1993-1994

Chamber music
 Douze préludes pour quatre pianos imaginaires 	1995 		
 L'octobre seul, pour quintette 	1991 		
 La vague en son écrin, trio de flûtes à bec 	1994 		
 Oxymore, solo pour deux percussionnistes 	1994 		
 Tic-tac parc, musica per il parco Val Grande 	1997

Soloist music
 Lecture d'une vague, «Prélude des Champs de l'ombre blanche»,1992 	
 Roque, pour violoncelle 	1990 		
 Sombra, pour violon 	1999

References

Microtonal musicians
1961 births
People from Valenciennes
French opera composers
Male opera composers
20th-century classical composers
French classical composers
French male classical composers
21st-century classical composers
Living people
20th-century French composers
21st-century French composers
20th-century French male musicians
21st-century French male musicians